AFB Langebaanweg   is an airbase of the South African Air Force (SAAF).
The base motto is Tenax Propisiti Vinco – Through Tenacity Comes Success.

Units hosted 
 Central Flying School SAAF - Pilot and Instructor Training
 2 Air Servicing Unit - Technical Support
 526 Squadron - Protection Squadron

Current aircraft 

The Central Flying School operates 60 Pilatus PC-7s from AFB Langebaanweg.

The SAAF's Silver Falcons display team is based at AFB Langbaanweg.

References

Langebaanweg
Langebaanweg
Transport in the Western Cape